Simone Wild (born 7 December 1993) is a Swiss alpine ski racer who competed at the 2018 Winter Olympics.

References

External links
 
 

1993 births
Living people
Swiss female alpine skiers
Place of birth missing (living people)
Alpine skiers at the 2018 Winter Olympics
Olympic alpine skiers of Switzerland
21st-century Swiss people